Mustafa Denizli (born 10 November 1949) is a Turkish football coach and former player. He has managed many  notable Turkish football clubs, including "Istanbul Big Three" (Fenerbahçe, Galatasaray and Beşiktaş) and has won the Süper Lig title three times. He is the only manager in history to win the Süper Lig with three clubs.

Managerial career

Early years
Denizli was appointed manager of FK Khazar Lankaran on 3 December 2013, with a one-and-a-half year deal. On 16 May 2014, Denizli terminated his contract with Khazar.

He also has worked outside Turkey with Alemannia Aachen in Germany, Pas and Persepolis in Iran and Khazar Lankaran in Azerbaijan. He managed the Turkish national team for four years and reached the quarter-finals of Euro 2000. On 23 December 2011, he returned to Persepolis but resigned at the end of the season. He spent 17 years with his hometown club Altay in İzmir, gaining a reputation as one of the best players in the position of attacking left forward in the league's history.
On 9 October 2008 he signed a 1-year contract with Beşiktaş. On 30 May the club claimed its 13th Süper Lig title under his guidance. Denizli is the only one in Turkey who have won the national league with the ""three biggest"" football clubs; Beşiktaş, Fenerbahçe and Galatasaray as a manager. With 2008–09 league title, Denizli also clings to the achievement of being "the one and only Turkish coach Beşiktaş earned the league title with". 2 June 2010 According to a number of reports from Turkey, experienced gaffer Denizli has resigned as head coach of Süper Lig titans Beşiktaş due to medical reasons.

Third term at Galatasaray 
On 19 November 2015, Galatasaray manager Hamza Hamzaoğlu left his position as a result of mutual agreement. On 22 November 2015, Denizli said "Galatasaray's president called me. I am going to meet with him tomorrow, negotiating for managerial position" on TRT Spor broadcast. A day later, Galatasaray's president Dursun Aydın Özbek met with Denizli at Point Hotel Beşiktaş, Istanbul and he said "I offered managerial position to Mustafa Denizli and he accepted in principle. We will sign the official contract in a few days" on the press conference. Denizli commented "I started my career's unforgettable success' here and I want close the parenthesis here."

Before the signing, Denizli followed UEFA Champions League match, Galatasaray played with Atlético Madrid in Vicente Calderón Stadium. But in this match, the team was managed by Cláudio Taffarel as the interim manager. On 26 November 2015, he signed a contract until June 2017 in Florya Metin Oktay Sports Complex and Training Center.

Denizli started his third term at Galatasaray with a 2–2 draw against Kasımpaşa in Süper Lig. Team was beat Bursaspor with 3-0 in Ali Sami Yen Sports Complex, which is his second match. On 8 December 2015, team draw against 1-1 with FC Astana but they took third place in UEFA Champions League C Group and qualified for 2015–16 UEFA Europa League knockout phase. He said "This was the hardest 90 minutes of my career." after the game. His last European match in 1991–92 European Cup Winners' Cup with Werder Bremen while he was a coach of Galatasaray until this match.

His first derby was with Beşiktaş in Atatürk Olympic Stadium and Galatasaray lost 2-1 this match. Besides, this was first defeat of Denizli on third term. After this, Galatasaray was met with Akhisar Belediyespor, impending Turkish Cup and beat in two matches. Denizli went outside Istanbul with Kastamonuspor match since appointed of manager. Denizli resigned from his duty on 1 March 2016.

Kasımpaşa
On 2 October 2018, Denizli was appointed as the head coach of Kasımpaşa. Denizli resigned in May 2019 two weeks before the end of the season.

Tractor
Denizli was appointed as head coach of Tractor in June 2019. One of his biggest successes during his career at Tractor FC, was winning the Persepolis–Tractor rivalry and when he was the head coach, Tractor defeated Persepolis after more than five years. However, he was sacked on 7 December 2019 after a series of bad results, including a 4–2 home loss to Esteghlal.

Career statistics

Player

International

Scores and results list Turkey's goal tally first, score column indicates score after each Denizli goal.

Managerial statistics

Honours

Player
Altay
Turkish Cup: 1966–67, 1979–80

Managerial
Galatasaray
Süper Lig: 1987–88
Turkish Cup: 1990–91
Cumhurbaşkanlığı Kupası: 1988, 1991

Fenerbahçe
Süper Lig: 2000–01

Beşiktaş
Süper Lig: 2008–09
Turkish Cup: 2008–09

Çaykur Rizespor
TFF First League: 2012–13

Altay
TFF First League Playoffs: 2020–21

Awards and achievements
1.Lig top goalscorer: 1979–80 at Altay
IFFHS's 11th best national team coach in the world: 2000

Notes

References

External links

 
 
 
 
 
 
Mustafa Denizli – Coach profile at Mackolik.com 
 [http://asia.eurosport.com/football/mustafa-
denizli_prs383/person.shtml Mustafa Denizli] at Eurosport.com
 

1949 births
Living people
People from Çeşme
Cretan Turks
Turkish footballers
Turkey international footballers
Turkish football managers
Altay S.K. footballers
Galatasaray S.K. footballers
Galatasaray S.K. (football) managers
Fenerbahçe football managers
Beşiktaş J.K. managers
UEFA Euro 2000 managers
Expatriate football managers in Iran
Tractor S.C. managers
Süper Lig players
Alemannia Aachen managers
Turkey national football team managers
Süper Lig managers
Manisaspor managers
Çaykur Rizespor managers
Turkish expatriate sportspeople in Iran
Turkish expatriate sportspeople in Germany
Turkish expatriate football managers
Khazar Lankaran FK managers
Association football forwards
Expatriate football managers in Germany
Persian Gulf Pro League managers